Raize may refer to:

 Toyota Raize, a rebadged A200 series Daihatsu Rocky subcompact crossover SUV
 Jason Raize (1975–2004), an American actor